Since 2008, Sirius XM Radio has had a similar channel lineup, with a few differences based on whether the individual has a Sirius, XM, or SiriusXM radio. For technical reasons, separate radios continue to be manufactured for the separate services despite the programming lineups having since been merged. The Lynx and Edge radios are on the SiriusXM platform, the Onyx and XM3pi radios are on the XM platform, and the Sportster and Starmate radios are on the Sirius platform.

The following is a list of channels on Sirius XM and Sirius XM Canada. There are over 150 full-time channels on Sirius XM, and over 140 of which are on Sirius XM Canada. Not included are channels that are specifically used for live sports programming, as well as former music channels that were merged with a duplicate music channel after the merger.

List

Preview

Pop

Rock

Hip hop/R&B

Dance/Electronic

Country

Christian

Jazz/Standards

Classical

Family

Sports

Comedy

Entertainment

News/Public radio/Politics/Issues

Religion

More

Holiday

Latin , French, Canadian, and international

Internet radio only
These channels are available online, and on the app:

Music

Other formats

xL

"xL" is a designation and rating in which the channel is uncensored, and contains explicit adult language or mature programming that may be offensive to some viewers.  Before the SiriusXM merger, Sirius's channels containing uncensored content were listed as either "Uncensored" or "Uncut" instead, with XM using the "xL" rating. On DirecTV listings, XM's xL-rated Channels are listed as "TV-MA" for profanity. On pay TV services Dish Network and Bell Fibe TV listings, XM's xL-rated Channels are listed as "Adult" for music programming and adult entertainment programs as well as radio stations aimed at the adult radio genres, as well as adult education radio.

List of xL Channels:

Sirius Satellite Radio

 SIRIUS Hip-Hop Nation – Non-stop Hip-Hop 24/7
 SIRIUS Shade 45 – Shady's Hardcore Hip-Hop
 SIRIUS Hot Jamz – Today's Mainstream Hip-Hop and R&B Hits
 SIRIUS Raw Dog Comedy – Uncensored Comedy
 SIRIUS Faction – Music of Action Sports

XM Satellite Radio

 xL Boneyard - Heavy Rock Oldies
 xL XMLM – Today's uncensored heavy metal
 xL Ethel – New Alternative Rock (Used to be DJ-free and xL, but lost its "xL" Rating and was hosted by DJs every now and then.)
 xL SquiZZ – New Heavy Rock
 xL The Rhyme – Snoop Dogg's uncut Old School Hip-hop
 xL RAW - Uncut Contemporary Rap/Hip-Hop
 xL High Voltage/the ViRUS – The Opie and Anthony Show/The Ron and Fez Show
 xL XM Comedy – Uncensored Comedy
 xL Laugh Attack – Uncensored Canadian Comedy
 xL Extreme XM – Extreme Talk

Online Channels

 xL Dirty Dog – Down & Dirtiest Comedy (Discontinued)
 xL UCB Radio – Skits, Sketches & Underground Comedy from the Upright Citizens Brigade (Discontinued)
 xL SiriusXM Comedy Showcase – The Comedy Club (Discontinued)
 xL Sway's Universe – Lifestyle with Sway Calloway
 xL Wake Up With Jordan Peltz - Political Talk (Discontinued)
 xL Faction Punk – Uncensored Punk Rock 
 xL Playboy Radio en Español – Uncensored en Español (Discontinued)
 xL Vivid Radio – Hot Sex Radio Talk (Discontinued)

Current xL Channels
 xL Pandora Now - Today's uncensored Pop
 xL Radio Andy – Uncensored Talk with Andy Cohen
 xL SiriusXM FLY – Hip-Hop and R&B Hits of the 90's and 2000's 
 xL Howard 100 – The Howard Stern Show
 xL Howard 101 – The World of Howard Stern 
 xL Faction Talk – Talk with Jim Norton, Sam Roberts and Jason Ellis
 xL Canada Laughs – Uncensored Canadian Comedy
 xL SiriusXM Turbo – Hard rock from the 90's & 2000's
 xL LL Cool J's Rock the Bells Radio – LL Cool J's Uncut Classic Hip-Hop
 xL Hip-Hop Nation – Today's Hip-Hop Hits
 xL Shade 45 – Eminem's Hardcore Hip-Hop
 xL Comedy Central Radio – Uncensored comedy from Comedy Central
 xL Sirius XM Stars – Women's Talk and Entertainment 
 xL SiriusXM Comedy Greats – Uncensored Comedy with the Greatest Comedians of All-Time
 xL Jeff & Larry's Comedy Roundup (formerly Blue Collar Radio) – All-American Comedy with Larry the Cable Guy and Jeff Foxworthy
 xL Kevin Hart's Laugh Out Loud Radio – Uncensored Urban Comedy with Kevin Hart
 xL Raw Dog Comedy – Uncensored Comedy Hits
 xL Liquid Metal – Heavy metal and Extreme metal
 xL Jason Ellis – The Jason Ellis Show
 xL Carlin's Corner – Uncensored Comedy presented by George Carlin
 xL Barstool Radio – Satirical Sports and Men's Talk
 xL Netflix is a Joke Radio - Commercial-free Standup Comedy from Netflix

Former XL Channels

 XL Ethel – New Alternative Rock (Lost its "xL" Explicit Language rating since 2004)
 Playboy Radio – Adult Entertainment programming (Cancelled since 2013) 
 xL Dirty Dog – Down & Dirtiest Comedy (Discontinued since 2014)
 Sirius OutQ – LGBT News, Talk & Entertainment for Gay & Lesbian people (discontinued since 2016)
 xL Outlaw Country – Alternative Country and Outlaw Country (Lost its "XL" Rating since in the Later 2010s)
 xL SiriusXM Comedy Showcase – The Comedy Club (discontinued since 2014)
 xL UCB Radio – Skits & Underground Comedy (discontinued since 2014)
 xL The Foxxhole – Uncensored Urban comedy, Urban contemporary, Hip-hop and R&B hits with Jamie Foxx (Discontinued since 2018)

Former channels
(Most recent changes on top)
 SiriusXM 1st Traffic and Weather - Continuous traffic and weather reports for major markets (channels cut January 2017; last channels dropped March 1, 2023)
 88Rising Radio (305) - Asian hits curated by 88rising
 102.7 KIIS-FM simulcast (dropped in May 2022)
Z100 in New York City simulcast (dropped in May 2022)
 The Garth Channel (55) - Music of Garth Brooks and other artists (country and non-country) that he enjoys (2016–2022)
 Happy Radio (708) (formerly StayHome Radio) - played upbeat pop music
 Cinemagic (750) - devoted to film scores (dropped on December 7, 2021)
 Radio Disney (79) – Pop music for tweens and teens (dropped on December 31, 2020)
 Coldplay Radio (28) - Limited time station for the band Coldplay (from July 15 until August 13, 2020)
 SIRIUS BackSpin – Old Skool Rap
 TheBlaze Radio talk (dropped on April 5, 2017)
 Entertainment Weekly Radio – Pop Culture News and Reviews
 Classic College Radio – classic Indie Rock 
 Oprah Radio – self-help talk
 Top 20 on 20 – was a hits station whose song list was determined by listener voting (dropped on July 17, 2014).
 World Radio Network – was "An international tour of the news from broadcasters worldwide" (dropped on April 25, 2013)
 Martha Stewart Living Radio – was a variety of programming channel (dropped on February 18, 2013)
 Playboy Radio – was an uncensored adult content station (dropped on March 14, 2013)
 Fox News Talk – conservative talk radio operated by the Fox Broadcasting Company (dropped on February 14, 2013)
 BBC Radio 1 – modern and current popular radio station operated by the British Broadcasting Corporation (dropped on August 9, 2011)
 New Country - Replaced by The Highway on November 12, 2008
 Rumbón (83) – was a tropical/reggaeton radio station (replaced by Caliente on November 12, 2008); later revived on a different channel
 SIRIUS Disorder (33) – was a Freeform/Eclectic radio station (dropped on November 12, 2008)
 The Beat (36) – Was a Top 40 Dance Hits station (Replaced by XM's BPM on November 12, 2008)
 Sirius Super Shuffle (12) – was an adult hits station (dropped from online service November 12, 2008)
 Universo Latino (90) – Universo Latino is a Spanish Pop mixed music radio station (dropped on November 12, 2008)
 Boombox (39) – Boombox was a Breakbeat and Old Skool remix radio station on Sirius Satellite Radio channel 39 and DISH Network channel 6034, (dropped on November 12, 2008)
 Hot Jamz (50) – Hip-Hop, Urban Contemporary and R&B (replaced by XM's The Heat on November 12, 2008)
 E! Entertainment Radio (107) – Entertainment news and Celebrity Gossip, (dropped on November 12, 2008)
 Punk (29) – Was a Punk and Ska radio station. On September 15, 2008, it was replaced with a 24-hour AC/DC channel.
Client 9 Radio (126) – Talk channel ran from March 14, 2008, at 5:00 pm ET through midnight on March 17, 2008, to discuss the Eliot Spitzer scandal.
 LIME Radio (114) – Healthy Lifestyle (dropped on February 13, 2008).
 Court TV Plus (110) – Live trial proceedings (dropped on January 1, 2008) – channel now broadcasts "P.O.T.U.S.".
 ABC News & Talk (143) – News/talk and entertainment from ABC (dropped on September 24, 2007).
 Planet Jazz (70) – Modern Jazz and Contemporary Jazz music (dropped on September 7, 2007)
 The Who Channel (29) – The Who music (dropped on April 1, 2007)
 Discovery Channel Radio (119) – Discovery Channel programming (dropped on February 14, 2007).
 Revolution (67) – Christian rock (dropped on February 14, 2007).
Sports Byline USA (122) – Sports Talk and Play-by-Play (dropped on February 14, 2007).
Rolling Stones Radio (98) – All Rolling Stones music (dropped on January 1, 2007).
PRI (136) – Global Issues (dropped on September 25, 2006).
BBC Mundo (182) –  News, (dropped on September 25, 2006)
 Classical Voices (85) – Opera, (dropped on September 25, 2006)
WSM Entertainment Radio (117) – Simulcast of 650 WSM in Nashville. Broadcast the Grand Ole Opry (dropped on September 13, 2006).
Sirius RIGHT (145) – Some programming from this channel was merged into Sirius Patriot (dropped on March 14, 2006).
Sirius Advice (117) – Advice programming. Upon deletion, programs were added to other Sirius channels (dropped on March 14, 2006).
Mexicana (91) – Played Regional Mexican music (dropped on March 14, 2006).
EWTN Radio Catolica Mundial (180) – Spanish language Catholic programming (dropped on March 14, 2006).
Remix (62) – Played exclusive remixes of modern dance music (dropped on September 29, 2005).
Wax (42) – Featured mixed and remixed hip-hop (dropped on September 29, 2005).
Slow Jamz (52) – Featured modern soft R&B and Soul ballads (dropped on September 29, 2005).
Swing Street (73) – Played swing music from the 1930s, 1940s, and 1950s (dropped on September 29, 2005).
Folk Town (38) – Played contemporary and traditional folk music (dropped on September 29, 2005).
Hispanic Talk (181) – Featured Spanish language talk radio (replaced with "ESPN Deportes" on December 1, 2005).
 The Weather Channel Radio (110–112) – Provided continual weather forecasts (dropped on September 29, 2005).
Wisdom Radio (132) – Dedicated to new age thinkers and life improvement methods. Rebranded as "Lime" on September 29, 2005.
The Word Network (161) – Featured Gospel music and urban ministries from a Protestant and Gospel perspective (dropped on September 29, 2005).
 Air America Radio (144) – Featured liberal talk radio, mainly which were Air America personalities. Dropped in July 2005 when Air America went exclusively with XM Satellite Radio.
Vacation (97) – Played island vacation music—replaced with "Radio Margaritaville" in June 2005.
Talk for Women (Our Time) (131) – Featured women-oriented talk and entertainment programming (dropped in May 2005).
Street Beat (44) – Featured rap and New Hip-hop hits (dropped in October 2004).
La Red Hispana (117) – Featured news and talk programming in Spanish (replaced with "Hispanic Talk" in July 2004).
Planet Dance (63) – Played mainstream dance music (replaced with "Area 63"—then Area—in July 2004, then became Diplo's Revolution).
Radio Deportivo (128) – Featured sports programming in Spanish (dropped in July 2004).
The Border (36) – Played alternative country (replaced with "Outlaw Country" in April 2004).
Country Road (32) – Played a mix of classic country and modern country (replaced with "Prime Country" in January 2004).
House Party (60) – Played house music (dropped in January 2004).
The Vortex (64) – Played trance music (dropped in January 2004).
Planet Rhyme (41) – Featured international hip-hop (dropped in January 2004).
Vista (82) – Played chamber music (dropped in January 2004).
Soundscapes (98) – Played new age music (dropped in January 2004).
SIRIUS Sessions (100) – Played live music (dropped in January 2004).
Sirius Entertainment (135) – Featured programming about celebrities and the world of entertainment (replaced with "Our Time – Talk for Women" in January 2004).
 A&E Satellite Radio (137) – Featured programming from the A&E television network (dropped in January 2004).
Radio Amigo (140) – A Spanish language talk channel (dropped in January 2004).
Radio Mujer (141) – A Spanish language talk channel (dropped in January 2004).
The Express (44) – Old School/Funk R&B (dropped in February 2003).
106.7 Lite FM (13) – Simulcast of WLTW 106.7 Lite FM in New York City (dropped in December 2003)

See also
 XM Satellite Radio channel history

References

External links
 Sirius XM Channel lineup
 Official Sirius XM Radio Channel List July 2020 
 Official Sirius XM Canada Channel List

Lists of radio stations